Marcos Ramírez de Prado y Ovando O.F.M. (April 24, 1592 – May 14, 1667) was a Roman Catholic prelate who served as Archbishop of Mexico (1666–1667), Bishop of Michoacán (1639–1666), and Bishop of Chiapas (1632–1639).

Biography
Ovando was born in Madrid, Spain, and ordained a priest in the Order of Friars Minor.  On October 9, 1632, he was selected by the King of Spain and confirmed on January 31, 1633 by Pope Urban VIII as Bishop of Chiapas. On June 6, 1633, he was consecrated bishop by Juan Guzman, Archbishop of Zaragoza with Juan Bravo Lagunas, Bishop of Ugento, and Miguel Avellán, Auxiliary Bishop of Toledo, as co-consecrators. On May 30, 1639, he was selected by the King of Spain and confirmed by Pope Urban VIII as Bishop of Michoacán. He was installed on March 17, 1640. On December 15, 1666, he was selected by the King of Spain and confirmed by Pope Alexander VII as Archbishop of Mexico where he served until his death on May 14, 1667.

Episcopal succession
While bishop, Ovando was the principal consecrator of:
Juan Ruiz de Colmenero, Bishop of Guadalajara (1647); 
Juan López, Bishop of Cebu (1665); 
Francisco Verdín y Molina, Bishop of Guadalajara (1666);
 
and principal co-consecrator of:
Mendo de Benavides, Bishop of Segovia (1634).

References

External links and additional sources
 (for Chronology of Bishops) 
 (for Chronology of Bishops)  
 (for Chronology of Bishops) 
 (for Chronology of Bishops) 

1592 births
1667 deaths
17th-century Roman Catholic archbishops in Mexico
Roman Catholic archbishops of Mexico (city)
17th-century Roman Catholic bishops in Mexico
Bishops appointed by Pope Urban VIII
Bishops appointed by Pope Alexander VII
Franciscan bishops